Red White N Cruel is the debut EP by singer Kossisko. The EP was released on November 13, 2015, by Cutcraft Music Group.

Track listing

References

2015 debut EPs
Alternative hip hop EPs